The MAVTV 500 was an IndyCar Series race held at Auto Club Speedway in Fontana, California. The event represented a continuous lineage of open wheel oval racing in the Southern California-area that dates back to 1970. Since 2012, the event had been sponsored by MAVTV, a motorsports cable channel owned by Lucas Oil.

For many years in the late 1990s and early 2000s, the race served as the season finale for the CART series. From 2012-2014, it served as the finale for the IndyCar Series.

In 2015, the race was moved to June. Despite several journalists calling the 2015 edition one of the best IndyCar races, the race did not return on the schedule for 2016.

History

CART
CART renewed the 500-mile oval race in 1997 at the newly built California Speedway in Fontana, California. The new track was built just  from the previous Ontario Motor Speedway where the California 500 was held between 1970 to 1980. Indy car races were also held at nearby Riverside, but only from 1967–1969 (prior to the opening of Ontario) and again from 1981–1983 (after Ontario closed).

The Fontana race was held under the moniker Marlboro 500, and served as the CART season finale. This event was held through 2002. The race became known for closed-course record speeds, and fast and competitive racing, owing much to the track's width.

The 1999 race is considered a tragic day in the history of CART, after the fatal crash of Greg Moore. The 2003 event was cancelled due to the Old Fire.

Along with the popular Long Beach Grand Prix, the Southern California area featured two major open wheel CART races annually for a time.

Indy Racing League / IndyCar
In 2002, the IRL IndyCar Series added a 400-mile race to the facility. Fontana became the first facility to host races from both rival open wheel series (CART and IRL), although the race distance was different (500 vs 400 miles). The Toyota Indy 400 was held through 2005. However, crowds dwindled, and the event was removed from the calendar.

The now-unified IndyCar Series returned to Fontana for the 2012 season with a 500-mile fall night race under the lights. The race served as the season finale from 2012-2014. For 2015, the race was moved to June.

Closed-course speed records
Two world closed course speed records were established in qualifying for the CART event. Gugelimin had furthermore turned an unofficial lap of  during the morning practice.

On October 28, 2000, Gil de Ferran of Penske Racing topped Gugelmin's time driving a Reynard/Honda.

In 2002, the 500-mile CART series race averaged 197.995 mph, and stood as the fastest 500-mile race in history (either open wheel cars or stock cars) for a dozen years. The record stood until the 2014 Pocono 500.
The 2003 IRL/IndyCar race was the fastest circuit race ever in motorsport history, with an average speed of 207.151 mph (333.306 km/h) over 400 miles (643.737km).

Race results

2000: Race started on Sunday but finished on Monday due to rain.
2001: Race started late because of rain and was shortened because of darkness.

Firestone Indy Lights 

2001: Race shortened due to time limit.

References

External links
Champ Car Stats: Ontario archive, Fontana archive
Ultimate Racing History: Ontario archive, Fontana archive

MAVTV 500
Former IndyCar Series races
Champ Car races